William Joseph Lincoln (1870 – 18 August 1917) was an Australian playwright, theatre manager, film director and screenwriter in the silent era. He produced, directed and/or wrote 23 films between 1911 and 1916.

One obituary called him "undoubtedly   the   pioneer   of   the Australian   picture-producing   industry."

Another obituary echoed these sentiments, adding that:
His faith in the possibilities of Australia as a centre of' activity in moving picture production was unbounded, and for many years past he had devoted his energies chiefly to the realisation of this conviction. In common with others with whom he was at different periods associated in the making of film stories, -Mr Lincoln's work was carried on under conditions that might well have daunted the most sanguine. That he made admirable use of the materials that lay to his hand is generally admitted, and in some of his earlier productions he achieved a technical standard that was little if at all inferior to the output of the overseas studios at that time.
Film historians Graham Shirley and Brian Adams wrote that Lincoln's films "were more like stage tableaux than films. However, with the right ingredients at their disposal the best of Lincoln's early productions were well-received".

Early life and career
Lincoln was born in Melbourne, the only son of Thomas and Esther Lincoln, and was brought up in St Kilda.

Playwright
He began as a playwright his first credit seemingly One Summer's Eve (1890). He wrote the play The Bush King which debuted in London in 1893 and in Melbourne in 1894. This play would later be rewritten by Alfred Dampier, a version which premiered in 1901 and became very successful over the following decade, being adapted into the popular film Captain Midnight, the Bush King (1911).

Lincoln wrote the one act plays After Sundown (1896) and An Affair of Honour (1897). He wrote another play The Power of Wealth (1900) which was also performed by Dampier, though with less success than The Bush King. He wrote the book to the pantomime Little Red Riding Hood.

Manager
Lincoln first became involved with the film industry for J. C Williamson, managing his Anglo-American Bio-Tableau in 1904 to 1905.

He then managed the Australasian tour of the Gaiety Company for Williamson. While doing this he received notice to meet up with Clement Mason who had film of the Russo-Japanese War. Lincoln toured with this and some other films throughout Western Australia. It was a massive success with the public.

According to Lincoln's obituary "He worked with Meynell,   Gunn   and   Clarke   in   their   early   days" (the Meynell and Gunn Dramatic Company). He did this from 1906 to 1909. In 1907 Harold Bessett went bankrupt. He blamed Lincoln, his manager, but Lincoln denied this. He then became the theatrical manager of Miss Lancashire Ltd which toured Australia; this production starred Florence Baines. Lincoln also worked as an advertising copywriter for The Bulletin.

According to one newspaper report he produced and directed the feature film The Story of the Kelly Gang (1907) but this seems doubtful. Lincoln himself attributed the direction to Sam Crews.

In 1909 he became manager of the Paradise of Living Pictures movie theatre in St Kilda, Melbourne, Victoria, one of the earliest moving picture palaces in Melbourne. He had begun to write and direct films for show in the theatre.

Filmmaker

Amalgamated Pictures
Lincoln made his film debut as director and writer with It Is Never Too Late to Mend (1911), based on a popular play and novel, for the Tait brothers. They appointed him director of their new company, Amalgamated Pictures, for whom he made nine films over the next year most based on play adaptations of a novel: The Mystery of a Hansom Cab (1911), The Luck of Roaring Camp (1911), Called Back (1911), The Lost Chord (1911), The Bells (1911), The Double Event (1911), After Sundown (1911) (based on Lincolns own play, but the film was not commercially released), Breaking the News (1911) and Rip Van Winkle (1912). After from the not-released After Sundown the films did good business. During this time Lincoln continued to manage the Paradise Gardens.

In later writing about these films Lincoln said "I am... in a somewhat awkward position in appraising their merits, but in justice to those who assisted in these productions, I may say that their work under discouraging conditions, Is entitled to the highest commendation."

A writer said of It Is Never Too Late to Mend, Mystery of the Hansom Cab and Called Back that "They were very cheaply produced   (the cost per film was between £300 and £400),   and   Johnson and   Gibson must have   done   well   out   of   them,   although   they  were   not   first-class. How could they be?"

Another article wrote Lincoln "had an undoubted capacity for .writing scenarios, and he had an excellent dramatic company, so that he produced quite a number of photo-plays. There were some big fakes in then occasionally, as when the St. Kilda railway station did duty for the great Euston station of London in Called Back.

The Taits withdrew from film production around 1912 to focus on importing and distributing overseas films, which was cheaper than making local movies. In 1912 Lincoln became publicity manager of Amalgamated. The following year he bought out Amalgamated Picture's interest in the "Paradise" theatre.

A 1913 article called Lincoln "a captivating conversationalist".

Lincoln-Cass Film Company
In 1913 Lincoln partnered with Godfrey Cass to make films as the Lincoln-Cass Film Company. According to a contemporary report "Mr. Lincoln has the literary taste, the business qualifications, and wide experience as a showman to justify him in taking this step." Lincoln said "they were Australians, and hopeful of interesting the public in Australian pictures. With the interest of the public and the generosity of the managers, they hoped to succeed, and to illustrate much which was interesting in Australia and its features."

The company survived for only one year, but in that time it made eight films, most of which Lincoln directed. These were The Sick Stockrider (1913), based on the poem by Adam Lindsay Gordon, The Remittance Man, Transported, The Road to Ruin (1913), The Crisis (1913), and The Reprieve (1913). Australian films were now struggling to compete with American product – according to one report, the meteoric progress made in the development of moving pictures in America, due chiefly to the exploiting of the growing popular taste for this form of entertainment by wealthy organisations, quickly left the Australian product behind."

J. C. Williamson Ltd
Lincol n later worked for J. C. Williamson Ltd when they moved into film production.

Lincoln wrote the scripts for Within Our Gates (1915), directed by Frank Harvey, and Within the Law (1916), directed by Monte Luke. Lone Hand wrote that in Within Our Gates Lincoln " succeeded   in   producing   a   strong   story  of   German   intrigue   and   cunning,   of   patriotism   and   valor   all   happening   within   our   gates.  Startling   as   the   story   is,   it   is   made   to   appear  quite   feasible."

He was originally supposed to direct as well but by this stage his alcoholism had gotten out of control, causing him to be removed as director of Get-Rich-Quick Wallingford (1916); actor Fred Niblo took over the job, launching Niblo's considerable career as director. Niblo directed Officer 666 for Williamson's with Lincoln working as writer.

In October 1915 it was announced that Lincoln "has been in poor health lately, and has had to take things quietly. He is contemplating spending a few weeks at one of the mountain resorts, and while there will looks over, manuscripts of some big film, factories which are under consideration for future production."

Lincoln recovered sufficiently to write and direct Nurse Cavell (1916) and La Revanche (1916).

Later years
Lincoln later formed Lincoln-Barnes Productions in partnership with G.H. Barnes, directing The Life's Romance of Adam Lindsay Gordon (1916).  The shoot was not easy and Lincoln was unwell during filming. However Cinema Papers later wrote "Lincoln was a talented director and this film shows the maturity he had reached in film production" adding that the movie "has a haunting beauty. The long camera shots, interior lighting and sophisticated direction mark him as a particularly sensitive and advanced director for that time."

Lincoln and Barnes would up in litigation against Amalgamated Pictures in 1917.

Lincoln's drinking got worse and he died in Sydney on 18 August 1917.

At the time of his death he was working on an adaptation of the stage play The Worst Woman in London called The Worst Woman in Sydney. It was unclear if this was a play or a film script.

An obituary described him as:
One of the stoutest champions of Australian moving picture production. Although his sanguine views of the business as a profitable investment were not shared by all his friends, it was conceded by everyone who kn6w him, that he had the courage of his convictions. In the early years of moving picture development, as a medium for dramatic expression, Mr. Lincoln achieved success as a maker of photodramas. Undaunted by the-fact that studio facilities were confined to improvisations of one sort and another, that practical experience was only to be acquired by spending money and risking failure, he stuck to his work, and secured results that, were the more to be commended in that they were obtained under such' discouraging conditions. That Australia could not keep pace in the general upward trend in production, was not the fault of Lincoln and others who strove to establish the industry here.

Lincoln's Bulletin obituary said his best films were The   Sick   Stockrider, After  Sundown,  Le   Revanche,  The   Bells   and  Adam   Lindsay   Gordon.

Personal life
Lincoln married Pearl Ireland (d. 4 February 1943) in 1896 – they were described as "a runaway match". They had one child, a daughter Marguerite ("Madge") (1897–1972). His daughter married in 1923.

Filmography
 Moonlite (1910) – based on his play Captain Moonlite
 Captain Midnight, the Bush King (1911) – based on his play
 It Is Never Too Late to Mend (Jan 1911) – based on his stage adaptation of novel, writer, director
 The Mystery of a Hansom Cab (March 1911) – director
 The Luck of Roaring Camp (March 1911) – writer, director
 Called Back (Apr 1911) – writer, director
 The Lost Chord (May 1911) – director
 The Bells (Oct 1911) – based on his stage adaptation of the play, writer, director
 The Double Event (Oct 1911) – writer, director
 After Sundown (lost, c. 1911) – director
 Breaking the News (1912) – writer, director
 Rip Van Winkle (1912) – director
 The Sick Stockrider (1913) – director
 Moondyne (1913) – director
 The Remittance Man (1913) – director
 Transported (1913) – director
 The Road to Ruin (1913) – director
 The Crisis (1913) – director
 The Reprieve (1913) – director
 The Wreck (1913) – director
 Within Our Gates (1915) (aka Deeds That Won Gallipoli) – writer
 The Life's Romance of Adam Lindsay Gordon (1916) – writer, producer, director
 Within the Law (1916) – writer
 Get-Rich-Quick Wallingford (1916) – writer
 Nurse Cavell (1916) – director, writer, producer
 La Revanche (1916) – director, writer, producer
 Officer 666 (1916) – writer

Select theatre credits
One Summer's Eve (1890) – writer
The Bush King (1893) – writer. Rewritten by Lincoln and Alfred Dampier (as Adam Pierre) in 1900
After Sundown (1896) – writer of one act play
An Affair of Honour (1897) – one act play, writer|*The Power of Wealth (1900) – writer
Little Red Riding Hood (pantomime) (1903) – writer of the book

References

Sources

External links

W. J. Lincoln at AustLit (subscription required)
W. J. Lincoln at Australian Variety Theatre Archive

W. J. Lincoln at National Film and Sound Archive
"PICTURE PROFILES IN THE OLDEN DAYS", a 1916 article by W. J. Lincoln on the history of Australian filmmaking
1902 article by Lincoln on the arts
"A Bush Funeral", 1907 article by Lincoln

1870 births
1917 deaths
1910s in Australian cinema
Australian film directors
Writers from Melbourne
Australian film studio executives
19th-century Australian businesspeople